Originally distributed through Deadboy & the Elephantmen's website, and also by various local Louisiana music stores, Song Mechanism showcases four songs that were later included in Deadboy's second full-length album We Are Night Sky. The EP is no longer in print.

Track listings
 "How Long the Night Was" (2:42)
 "Blood Music" (5:30)
 "Dressed Up in Smoke" (4:52)
 "The Misadventures of Dope" (5:43)

Dax Riggs albums
2004 EPs
Deadboy & the Elephantmen albums